Stella Dallas can refer to:

 Stella Dallas (novel), a 1920 novel by Olive Higgins Prouty
 Stella Dallas (1925 film), a silent film adaptation of the novel featuring Ronald Colman and Belle Bennett
 Stella Dallas (1937 film), an adaptation of the novel starring Barbara Stanwyck and John Boles
 Stella Dallas (radio series), a 1937–1955 adaptation of the novel

See also
 Stella (1990 film), a 1990 film adaptation of the novel